Lobelia boykinii is a species of flowering plant in the bellflower family known by the common name Boykin's lobelia. It is native to the eastern United States, where it occurs from Delaware to Florida. There is also a disjunct occurrence in New Hampshire.

This rhizomatous perennial herb produces a hollow stem up to 85 centimeters tall. The plant is semi-aquatic, often growing in water for part of the year. The needle-like leaves are alternately arranged. The flowers are blue or white. They are pollinated by insects, especially bees. Flowering is also affected by the water level.

This plant grows in cypress swamps and other wet habitat types, such as meadows, bays, and ponds.

A number of insect species have been observed visiting the plant, including Ceratina dupla, Augochlorella striata, Hylaeus confluens, Hylaeus modestus, Hoplitis truncata, Melissodes communis, and Geron holosericeus.

References

External links
USDA Plants Profile

boykinii
Flora of the Eastern United States
Plants described in 1839